Lolo is a census-designated place (CDP) in Missoula County, Montana, United States. It is part of the Missoula Metropolitan Statistical Area. The population was 4,399 at the 2020 census, an increase from its population of 3,892 in 2010. It is home to Travelers' Rest State Park, a site where Lewis and Clark camped in 1805 and again in 1806.

History
The Traveler's Rest site, in Lolo, is one of the few sites in the nation with physical confirmation of the visit of Lewis and Clark.

The 2017 Lolo Peak Fire burned thousands of acres near the town of Lolo, prompting evacuations and closure of U.S. Route 12.

Geography
Lolo is at  (46.765210, -114.085892).  The town lies at the intersection of U.S. Routes 12 and 93, and at the eastern end of the Lolo Trail. It also sits at the confluence of Lolo Creek and the Bitterroot River.

Demographics

As of the census of 2010, there were 3,892 people, 1,218 households, and 936 families residing in the CDP. The population density was 356.2 people per square mile (137.6/km2). There were 1,263 housing units at an average density of 132.8 per square mile (51.3/km2). The racial makeup of the CDP was 96.69% White, 0.24% African American, 0.89% Native American, 0.24% Asian, 0.21% from other races, and 1.74% from two or more races. Hispanic or Latino of any race were 1.03% of the population.

There were 1,218 households, out of which 44.0% had children under the age of 18 living with them, 61.6% were married couples living together, 10.3% had a female householder with no husband present, and 23.1% were non-families. 17.3% of all households were made up of individuals, and 4.5% had someone living alone who was 65 years of age or older. The average household size was 2.78 and the average family size was 3.15.

In the CDP, the population was spread out, with 31.3% under the age of 18, 8.2% from 18 to 24, 32.9% from 25 to 44, 20.8% from 45 to 64, and 6.8% who were 65 years of age or older. The median age was 32 years. For every 100 females, there were 100.2 males. For every 100 females age 18 and over, there were 96.5 males.

The median income for a household in the CDP was $43,846, and the median income for a family was $46,629. Males had a median income of $30,392 versus $22,188 for females. The per capita income for the CDP was $18,369. About 2.5% of families and 4.7% of the population were below the poverty line, including 5.8% of those under age 18 and 4.2% of those age 65 or over.

Climate
This climatic region is typified by large seasonal temperature differences, with warm to hot (and often humid) summers and cold (sometimes severely cold) winters.  According to the Köppen Climate Classification system, Lolo has a humid continental climate, abbreviated "Dfb" on climate maps.

Education

The Missoula Public Library has a branch location in Lolo.

Notable people
 William M. Allen, aerospace industrialist, was born in Lolo.
 James Lee Burke, mystery writer, maintains a home here.
 Richard Manning, environmentalist and journalist, resides here.

See also

 List of census-designated places in Montana
 Woodman School (1892)

References

External links

 Travelers' Rest
 Lolo's Population

Census-designated places in Missoula County, Montana
Census-designated places in Montana
Chinook Jargon place names